John Haymes Newton (born December 29, 1965) is a former American actor. He is known for his regular roles on the television programs Superboy as Clark Kent in the show's first season and as Ryan McBride on the soap opera Melrose Place.  He is currently focused on energy healing practices.

Career
John Newton is best known for playing the lead role of Clark Kent/Superboy in the TV series Superboy during the show's first season from 1988 to 1989. He was replaced by Gerard Christopher in the role for the remainder of the show's run. Besides Superboy, he played regular roles on the television programs Melrose Place and The Untouchables. He had a recurring role on Models, Inc. before being transferred onto Melrose Place after its cancellation. Both shows were part of the Beverly Hills, 90210 franchise. On the DVD release of Superboy: The Complete First Season in 2006, Newton appears as himself on the documentary featurette "Superboy: Getting Off the Ground" and provided audio commentary with executive producer Ilya Salkind on two episodes. He starred in The Christmas Card (2006) and the 2009 independent film Yesterday Was a Lie.

In 2011, Newton and his wife Jennifer lent their voices as Clark Kent/Superman and Lois Lane, respectively, in the animated fan film Superman Classic by animator Robb Pratt.

Filmography

 Superboy (1988–1989)
 Everyday Heroes (1990)
 CBS Schoolbreak Special (1991) 
 Cool as Ice (1991)
 Desert Kickboxer (1992)
 Alive (1993)
 The Untouchables (1993)
 Models Inc. (1994)
 Walker, Texas Ranger (1997)
 Goodbye America (1997)
 Viper (1997)
 Dark Tides (1998)
 Melrose Place (1998–1999)
 Operation Sandman (2000)
 Tru Calling (2003) S1-EP1 (Aaron McCann)
 Desperate Housewives (2004)
 The Christmas Card (2006)
 S.S. Doomtrooper (2006)
 The Haunting of Molly Hartley (2008)
 Yesterday Was a Lie (2009)
 Superman Classic (2011)
 The Mentalist (2011)
 Bizarro Classic (2012)
 Flash Gordon Classic'' (2015)

References

External links 
 

1965 births
American male film actors
American male television actors
Living people
People from Chapel Hill, North Carolina
Male actors from North Carolina
Male models from North Carolina